Acts of Beauty • Exit no Exit is the 55th album by Michael Nyman, the eighth on his own label, and the third of these to consist entirely of previously unrecorded work.  He does not perform on the album, but composed and produced it.  Acts of Beauty is a song cycle with texts by various writers commenting on the nature of art and beauty.  It is performed by Cristina Zavalloni and Sentieri Selvaggi, conducted by Carlo Boccadoro.  Exit no Exit was originally a vocal work for John Motson called Beckham Crosses, Nyman Scores, in tribute to the English association football team.  Here, the vocal part is rewritten for bass clarinet, and played by Andrew Sparling of the Michael Nyman Band with the Nyman Quartet:  Gabrielle Lester, Catherine Thompson, Kate Musker, and Tony Hinnigan.

Acts of Beauty
Acts of Beauty features settings of material by Vincenzo Cartari, Kurt Schwitters, subject of Nyman's opera, Man and Boy: Dada, and Dziga Vertov, director of Man with a Movie Camera, a film he scored at the behest of the British Film Institute. "Marulla's Hobby" is about measuring erections.

Track listing
 "Due figliuole di un contadino" – 8:42
 "Halt, we are specialists" – 6:02
 "We are at a film studio" – 6:24
 "Life's chaos" – 3:21	
 "Marulla's hobby" – 1:41	
 "Exit No Exit 1" – 1:02	
 "Exit No Exit 2" – 1:10	
 "Exit No Exit 3" – 1:40	
 "Exit No Exit 4" – 1:34
 "Exit No Exit 5" – 1:24
 "Exit No Exit 6" – 2:07
 "Exit No Exit 7" – 1:17	
 "Exit No Exit 8" – 1:28	
 "Exit No Exit 9" – 1:29	
 "Exit No Exit 10" – 10:35	
 "Exit No Exit 11" – 1:02

External links
MN Records official site

References

2006 albums
Michael Nyman albums